Luyuan Town is an urban town in Yanling County, Hunan Province, People's Republic of China.

Cityscape
The town is divided into 22 villages and one community, the following areas: Luyuan Community, Longhu Village, Tianxing Village, Aotou Village, Hutian Village, Mixi Village, Jingshan Village, Jinhua Village, Cuiqun Village, Yujiang Village, Xitang Village, Tangwang Village, Shuidong Village, Yanling Village, Nanchong Village, Liushan Village, Xinping Village, Xiatang Village, Xinghuo Village, Pengxi Village, Jiangkou Village, Tiantang Village, and Tianlong Village.

References

External links

Divisions of Yanling County